The Great American Celebrity Spelling Bee is a limited-run spelling bee game show featuring four teams of four celebrities playing for charity. The show aired on FOX on three consecutive Fridays: February 13, February 20, and February 27, 2004. The first two episodes were a standard game running for 60 minutes, with the third and final episode a 2-hour championship episode. The show was hosted by John O'Hurley.

References

External links
The Great American Celebrity Spelling Bee at the Internet Movie Database

2004 American television series debuts
2004 American television series endings
2000s American game shows